Waed Bouhassoun is a Syrian singer and oud player. She has released four solo albums of traditional Syrian music, and toured internationally since 2010. She is a founding instructor-performer for the project "Orpheus XXI – Music for life and dignity," supporting refugee musicians in Europe. In 2018, she was made a chevalier (knight) in the French Ordre des Arts et des Lettres.

Biography 

Bouhassoun was born in 1979, and grew up in Shaqqa, a small Druze village near As-Suwayda in Southern Syria. She began playing the oud at age seven, taught by her father. In high school, she began to play in regional competitions, and by age 18 had travelled widely in Syria as a performer.

She then entered the Higher Institute of Music in Damascus, where she studied for three years. There were no courses in Eastern singing, so she studied opera. She was asked to learn a Western instrument to play in the Syrian National Symphony Orchestra, but continued to study the oud instead.

In 2005, Bouhassoun had her first performance in France, at the Festival de l’imaginaire ("Festival of the Imaginary"), where she sang and played the oud as part of a play. To prepare for a solo performance at the next Festival de l’imaginaire, Bouhassoun travelled to Aleppo to train further as a singer wth traditional musicians. In 2007, Bouhassoun was invited to perform at the Festival of Sacred World Music in Fez, Morocco.

In 2010, Bouhassoun moved to Paris to begin a masters' degree in ethnomusicology researching Syrian Druze funerals, supervised by the ethnomusicologist Jean Lambert.

Beginning in 2016, Bouhassoun was one of the founding instructor-performers for the project "Orpheus XXI – Music for life and dignity," a program led by Jordi Savall to support refugees in Europe with traditional music training. The program was funded by the European Commission as part of the Creative Europe Programme on 29 September 2016. The project provides employment for refugee musicians, and teaches refugee children traditional music from their countries of origin, allowing for the preservation of cultural heritage and positive personal opportunities for participants. The first concerts took place in the summer of 2017, featuring Bouhassoun on the oud.

In 2018, Bouhassoun was made a chevalier (knight) in the French Ordre des Arts et des Lettres (Order of Arts and letters).

Bouhassoun remains based in Paris, but continues to return to Syria annually to visit family and research ethnomusicology.

Music 
Bouhassoun is an alto. She has released four solo albums, each featuring little more than her own voice and oud-playing. Her music has been praised for preserving Syria's rich cultural history, and for the intimate, minimalist beauty of her songs. Her third album, La voix de la passion (The Voice of Passion), features Nabatean Bedouin dialect poetry from the North of Syria where she has conducted field surveys for her masters' degree. Bouhassoun has also contributed to three albums published by Jordi Savall.

Solo albums 
 La voix de l’amour (A Voice for Love) (2009), released by the Arab World Institute and distributed by Harmonia Mundi – selected as a "coup de coeur" for the year by the Académie Charles Cros.
 L'âme du luth (The Soul of the Lute) (2014), Buda Musique – named a "coup de coeur" by the Académie Charles Cros 
 La voix de la passion (The Voice of Passion) (2017), Buda Musique.
 Les ames retrouvees (Souls Found) (2019), Buda Musique.

Group albums 
 Orient Occident II - Homage to Syria (2013), Alia Vox.
 Ramon Llull (2016), Alia Vox.
 Granada (2016), Alia Vox.

References 

Syrian women artists
Oud players
Syrian Druze
1979 births
Living people
21st-century Syrian women
21st-century Syrian artists
Chevaliers of the Ordre des Arts et des Lettres
Contraltos